Limia is a genus of livebearing fishes belonging to the Cyprinodontiform family Poeciliidae.

Limia may also refer to:

Limia River, a river in Galicia, Spain, and Portugal
Limia, Mozambique, a village in Ancuabe District in Cabo Delgado Province in northeastern Mozambique
A Limia, a comarca in the Province of Ourense, Galicia, Spain
A Baixa Limia, a comarca in the Province of Ourense, Galicia, Spain
Baixa Limia – Serra do Xurés, a natural park in the Province of Ourense, Galicia, Spain
Limia Cattle, a breed from the Province of Ourense
Alejandro Limia (born 1975), Argentine footballer